Narkissos (Greek: Νάρκισσος meaning narcissus) is a village in the municipal unit of Fanari in the Preveza regional unit in the region of Epirus, in western Greece.  In 2011 its population was 283.

History
Narkissos was one of the Albanian Orthodox villages which either due to the absence of Greek or for reasons of demographic importance, would see Greek education expanded, through measures such as the establishment of kindergartens.

References

Populated places in Preveza (regional unit)